Hliappui S is a village in the Champhai district of Mizoram, India. It is located in the Ngopa R.D. Block.

Demographics 

According to the 2011 census of India, Hliappui S has only 2 households. The effective literacy rate (i.e. the literacy rate of population excluding children aged 6 and below) is 100%.

References 

Villages in Ngopa block